The Espérance Sportive de Tunis Volleyball  (often referred to as EST) is one of Espérance Sportive de Tunis club's sections that represent the club in Tunisia and international volleyball competitions, the club team section based in capital Tunis since the year 1956.

History

Current squad 

Head coach:  Ljubomir Travica
Assistant coach:  Karim Ben Ayed

Technical and managerial staff

Honours

National Achievements
Tunisian League :
 Winners (22x titles) : 1963–64, 1964–65, 1965–66, 1966–67, 1967–68, 1968–69, 1975–76, 1977–78, 1992–93, 1995–96, 1996–97, 1997–98, 1998–99, 2006–07, 2007–08, 2014–15, 2015-16, 2017-18, 2018-19, 2019-2020, 2020-2021, 2021-2022
 Runners up (9x times) : 1978–79, 1984–85, 1993–94, 1994–95, 1999–00, 2005–06, 2009–10, 2010–11, 2013–14
 Third (3x times) : 1962–63, 2000–01, 2011–12

Tunisian Cup :
 Winners (20x cups) : 1963–64, 1964–65, 1965–66, 1966–67, 1979–80, 1992–93, 1993–94, 1995–96, 1996–97, 1998–99, 1999–20, 2006–07, 2009–10, 2013–14, 2016-17, 2017-18, 2018-19, 2019-20, 2020-21, 2021-22
 Runners up (10x vice champions) : 1967–68, 1968–69, 1974–75, 1978–79, 1997–98, 2008–09, 2011–12, 2012–13, 2014–15, 2015–16

Tunisian Supercup :
 Winners (7x Supercups) : 2007–08, 2008–09, 2017–18, 2018–19, 2019–20, 2020–21, 2021–22

Regional Achievements

Arab Clubs Championship :
 Winners (2x titles) : 2007, 2014
 Runners up (5x vice champions) : 1978, 1992, 2008, 2018, 2019
 Third (1x time) : 1996

International Achievements
African Club Championship :
 Winners (5x titles) : 1994, 1998, 2000, 2014, 2021
 Runners up (5x vice champions) : 1999, 2013, 2015, 2016, 2022

African Volleyball Cup Winners' Cup :

 Winners (0 x titles) :

 Runners up (1 x vice champions) : 1994

Head coaches
This is a list of the senior team's head coaches in the recent years.

As of 2014

Notable players
Tunisia
 Hassine Belkhouja
 Samir Tebourski
 Ghazi Guidara 
 Mohammed Baghdadi
 Khaled Belaïd

Africa
 Friday Abassin

Europe
 David Zoltàn

References

External links
Official website
Official facebook Page

Tunisian volleyball clubs
1956 establishments in Tunisia
Volleyball clubs established in 1956
Sport in Tunis